Sarah Asher Tua Geronimo-Guidicelli (born July 25, 1988) is a Filipino singer, performer and actress. Geronimo rose to prominence after winning the television singing contest Star for a Night earning her a recording contract with Viva Records. She has won 15 Awit Awards, 28 Myx Music Awards, 8 Aliw Awards, 4 FAMAS Awards including the prestigious FAMAS Golden Artist Award and a World Music Award. Tatler listed her as one of the most influential celebrities, while Forbes Asia named her one of the most powerful influencers.

Life and career

1988–2003: Early beginnings and Star for a Night
Sarah Asher Tua Geronimo was born on July 25, 1988, in Santa Cruz, Manila to Delfin Geronimo, a retired PLDT employee, and Divina Tua, who ran a beauty salon in their house. She is the third of four children. She started singing publicly at age two. At the age of four, she was accompanied by her mother to join auditions for different television programs. Geronimo became part of the shows Penpen de Sarapen (4–6 years old), Ang TV (7–8 years old) and NEXT (8–9 years old). She has also played as an extra in the movie Sarah... Ang Munting Prinsesa (1995). In between auditions, Geronimo would perform at shopping malls and hotel lounges. Geronimo, then age 7, was one of the performers during the 1995 visit of Pope John Paul II. Geronimo at an early age joined different singing contests the first of which was Tuklas Talino sponsored by the Philippine Long Distance Telephone Company (PLDT). 

In 2002, Geronimo competed in the television singing contest Star for a Night, airing in IBC. At the age of fourteen, she won the grand prize that included  and a managerial contract from Viva Entertainment. Geronimo released her first album Popstar: A Dream Come True in 2003. Her acting debuts were supporting roles in two of Viva's entries to the 2003 Metro Manila Film Festival: Filipinas and Captain Barbell (2003).

2004–2007: The Other Side and In Motion
Still managed by VIVA, Geronimo signed a TV contract with ABS-CBN network in 2004. She starred in her first television series, Sarah the Teen Princess (2004) and became a regular host and performer on the variety show ASAP (2004–present). Geronimo again had supporting roles in the films Annie B., Masikip sa Dibdib and Lastikman: Unang Banat all released in that same year. Geronimo sang the Philippine National Anthem at the pre-inaugural ceremonies of President Gloria Macapagal Arroyo on June 30, 2004. In November 2004, Geronimo released her second album, Sweet Sixteen that included the single "How Could You Say You Love Me". Geronimo performed in the Night of the Champions concert at the Araneta Coliseum with other singing competition winners Rachelle Ann Go and Erik Santos.

In 2005, Geronimo joined the cast of the teen-oriented television program SCQ Reload: Kilig Ako and hosted two seasons of the singing competition show Little Big Star (2005–2007). On September 30, 2005, Geronimo staged a solo concert at Araneta Coliseum entitled The Other Side.

In 2006, Geronimo starred in ABS-CBN's primetime soap opera, Bituing Walang Ningning, a remake of the 1985 movie. She played the role of an aspiring singer named Dorina Pineda, originally played by Sharon Cuneta in the movie, and released a soundtrack of the series. In July 2006, Geronimo release her third studio album, Becoming, produced by Christian De Walden. The album yielded three singles: "I Still Believe In Loving You", "Carry My Love" and "Iingatan Ko Ang Pag-ibig Mo". On November 18, 2006, Manny Pacquiao chose Geronimo to sing Lupang Hinirang, the Philippine national anthem, before his match against Mexico's Erik Morales at the Thomas and Mack Center in Las Vegas.

Geronimo staged her second major solo concert "In Motion" on July 14, 2007, at the Araneta Coliseum. Unlike her first solo concert, this concert went off with no technical glitches. She spent the rest of 2007 performing concerts in the Philippines and the U.S. and recording her fourth studio album, Taking Flight, which sold more than 60,000 units and achieved double-platinum status. In the latter half of 2007, Geronimo appeared in her third television series for ABS-CBN, Pangarap na Bituin.

2008–2010: The Next One and Record Breaker

In early 2008, Geronimo reunited with Erik Santos, Rachelle Ann Go, and Christian Bautista in a Valentine's Day concert at the Araneta Coliseum, entitled "OL4LUV". Before Geronimo released her fifth studio album, she released I'll Be There as the fourth single from Taking Flight. On July 30, 2008, Geronimo starred with Filipino actor John Lloyd Cruz in A Very Special Love which was produced by Star Cinema and VIVA films and grossed almost . Geronimo included a track from the film, "A Very Special Love", on her album Taking Flight.
Geronimo's fifth studio album, Just Me, included a duet with Backstreet Boys member Howie Dorough entitled, "I'll Be There". De Walden again produced this album. Like her previous albums, Just Me achieved platinum status in December 2008. She was recognized for this accomplishment on the 2008 ASAP Platinum Circle Awards show. On November 8, 2008, Geronimo staged her third major solo concert in Araneta Coliseum, entitled The Next One, which marked the first time she accompanied herself on the piano while on stage. Geronimo's Just Me album, was re-released, adding You Changed My Life. She was also recognized by ASAP for attaining platinum status for her albums Taking Flight and Just Me and for her two concert DVDs (The Other Side and Sarah in Motion).

In February 2009, Geronimo made a movie again with John Lloyd Cruz in You Changed My Life, the sequel of A Very Special Love. Geronimo traveled to the US in March to April 2009 for her The Next One tour, where she received positive reviews about her performances. In June 2009, she re-staged the Sarah Geronimo: The Next One Philippine concert tour. On August 5, 2009, Geronimo was given the honor to sing the Virna Lisa's 1986 People Power anthem, "Magkaisa" during the funeral of former President Corazon Aquino. Geronimo released a solo Christmas album, Your Christmas Girl in October 2009. In November 2009, she staged her fourth solo sold-out concert, Record Breaker, in the Araneta Coliseum. The Philippine Daily Inquirer called the concert "a qualified success". At the same day of her concert, she released her sixth studio album, Music and Me. In December 2009, Your Christmas Girl and Music and Me both reached platinum status after a month of their release.

On December 1, 2009, Geronimo received a star on the Philippines Walk of Fame at Libis, Eastwood. Geronimo released the DVD Record Breaker, filmed at the Araneta Coliseum, on March 16, 2010, and eventually achieved triple Platinum status in December 2010.

In April 2010, Geronimo was chosen to endorse an online game called Superstar which was launched by X-Play as an online singing star search. Geronimo also lent her voice in singing its theme song "This Is My Dream."

In September 2010, Geronimo starred in a musical series entitled 1DOL which was aired on ABS-CBN and she appeared in the film Hating Kapatid under Viva Films.

2011–2012: Catch Me, I'm in Love, Sarah G. Live!, and concerts
In February 2011, she had a Valentine concert with Martin Nievera titled "What Love Is" at the Araneta Coliseum.
Geronimo worked with Gerald Anderson in the film collaboration of Star Cinema and Viva Films entitled Catch Me, I'm in Love which was shown on March 23, 2011, in theaters nationwide and shown as a summer release in the Philippines. In November 2011, Geronimo made a movie again with Gerald Anderson in Won't Last A Day Without You which earned  on its opening day. Geronimo signed an exclusive one-year contract with ABS-CBN, it states her future projects and commitments such as having a weekly solo show, an extension as a performer in ASAP Rocks, and a movie with John Lloyd Cruz for the third time. Also this year, Geronimo is declared as the Princess of Philippine Movies by the Guillermo Mendoza Box Office Awards for her movie, Catch Me, I'm in Love together with Gerald Anderson.

In October of the same year, the singer took private lessons on Jazz music during her vacation in the USA. She was also vocally supervised by Yosha Honassan who later on became the writer of some of her jazz songs.

Geronimo had her solo weekly musical-variety show every Sunday night titled Sarah G. Live! and her movie with John Lloyd Cruz is in production.

In July 2012, Geronimo staged her fifth major solo concert in the "Big Dome" entitled 24/SG.
In November 2012, Geronimo was chosen as the "Bayanihan Ambassadress" of the Armed Forces of the Philippines.

In December 2012, Geronimo won a string of awards one of which is the Best Asian Artist Award (Philippines) at the recently concluded Mnet Asian Music Awards. Geronimo also won major awards in Awit Awards, Aliw Awards and PMPC Star Awards for Music.

2013–2015: The Voice of the Philippines and international activities
In 2013, Geronimo will have her own drama anthology entitled Sarah G. Presents. Geronimo is also set to be a coach and judge in The Voice of the Philippines.

In March 2013, Geronimo received two Presidential Awards, Ani ng Dangal for Multi-Disciplinary Arts and National Commission for Culture and the Arts (Philippines) Goodwill Ambassadress for Music. Geronimo is nominated for three categories at the 2013 World Music Awards (WMA): best entertainer of the year, best live act, and best female artist. Also her movie which is shown on March 30, 2013, It Takes a Man and a Woman broke box office records and became the highest grossing Filipino film of all time.

In June 2013, Viva Records announced that she wouldbe releasing her tenth studio album on July before her birthday. The album's title was later revealed to be Expressions, which was contain mainly original songs that she co-produced herself. It was released on July 22. On August 8, Geronimo became the brand endorser of KakaoTalk together with K-pop boyband Big Bang.

In December 2013, she was elevated into Anak TV Seal Hall of Famer for being a "credible, wholesome and worth emulating by the youth".
Geronimo was also nominated for the Best Southeast Asian Act category in the 2013 MTV Europe Music Awards.

On May 27, 2014, Geronimo are among the acts that won accolades in the 2014 World Music Awards held in Monaco, winning the Best Selling Philippines Artist award. She became the first Filipino music artist who received an award in the World Music Awards history.

On August 26, 2014, Spotify Philippines revealed that Geronimo was one of the most streamed artists within the country alongside band Eraserheads.

Geronimo release her eleventh studio album titled Perfectly Imperfect on October 4, 2014. The album also included songs which were written by international music producer Adam Hurstfield and Canadian singer Elise Estrada. The album's lead single, "Kilometro", premiered on September 17, 2014, and was written by Thyro & Yumi.

Geronimo was voted as the Best Southeast Asia Act at the 2014 MTV Europe Music Awards and was also nominated as Best Southeast Asia, China, Hong Kong, and Taiwanese Act.

She was included in BuzzFeed's 2014 list of The 20 Filipino Music Artists You Need To Listen Right Now.

Geronimo has been chosen by Disney to re-interpret the theme song of its Princess franchise. In a teaser aired on Disney Channel, Geronimo revealed that she did her own version of "The Glow" and that its music video will premiere on December 6, 2014.

In July 2015, Geronimo with her song "Kilometro" represented the Philippines in the 10th International Song Contest: The Global Sound hosted by Australian jury, as one of the 70 semi-finalists from different countries all over the world and later on advanced as one of the top 25 finalists. In the final round, Geronimo was adjudged as the winner and received the Gold Global Sound award. ISC: The Global Sound confirmed on their Facebook page that this is the first Asian country to win the contest.

Geronimo also starred in the blockbuster movie The Breakup Playlist, together with Filipino actor Piolo Pascual, which was shown in cinemas on July 1. The movie grossed PHP 200 million.

In October 2015, Geronimo was chosen to record Felix Manalo's theme song "Ang Sugo ng Diyos Sa Mga Huling Araw" and later won Best Movie Theme Song on both PMPC Star Awards for Movies and FAMAS Awards in 2016.

Xeleb Inc., the first celebrity mobile games company in the Philippines, tapped Geronimo for its newest gaming app, Sarah G Popsters. The app officially launched on November 24, 2015.

In December 2015, for the second consecutive year, Spotify Philippines hailed Geronimo as one of the most streamed Filipino artists alongside bands Eraserheads and Up Dharma Down.

On December 9, 2015, Geronimo received her 10th Awit Award. At the 28th Awit Awards, Perfectly Imperfect was awarded "Album of the Year".

On December 18, 2015, Geronimo was voted as the Asian Artist of the Year at the Hello Asia! K-Pop Awards 2015.

2016–2018: Endorsements, The Great Unknown, This 15 Me, Miss Granny and International Recognition
On February 29, 2016, Big Apple Music Awards announced on their official Twitter account that Geronimo has been nominated as "Best Filipino Female Artist".

In March 2016, Philippine Airlines officials, led by the chairman Dr. Lucio C. Tan and President Jaime J. Bautista, celebrated the airline's 75th anniversary during a gala dinner for PAL employees at the SMX-MOA in Pasay, where the flag carrier also unveiled its new advertising campaign – The Heart of the Filipino: Shining Through – with top Filipino singers Sarah Geronimo, Bamboo and Lea Salonga as endorsers.

On September 21, 2016, Geronimo was named as one of the nominees in the Best Southeast Asian Act for the 2016 MTV Europe Music Awards set on November 6, 2016, at the Ahoy Rotterdam in the Netherlands.

On October 12, 2016, Geronimo's The Great Unknown won Best Secular Album in the 38th Catholic Mass Media Awards. This is the second time Sarah received the award, the first was for Perfectly Imperfect album.

Geronimo was recognized as this year's Best Asian Performer during the Classic Rock Awards 2016 held in Tokyo, Japan on November 11, 2016.
Geronimo attended the awarding ceremony at the Ryogoku Kokugikan Stadium in Tokyo, where she performed the song "Anak" by Freddie Aguilar.

On November 29, 2016, Geronimo held her album show entitled The Great Unknown: Unplugged in Kia Theatre in promotion of her platinum-selling album The Great Unknown. Due to its success, Geronimo brought the show in different provinces in the country including Albay, Pampanga and Iloilo.

In March 2017, Geronimo confirmed that she will be returning as one of the coaches of The Voice Teens Philippines. Geronimo will return to the teens edition along with coaches Bamboo, Sharon Cuneta, and Lea Salonga.

On May 15, 2017, US-based World Top Musicians included her on their website.

In July 2017, Geronimo starred in the movie Finally Found Someone with John Lloyd Cruz. The movie served as a reunion movie of Geronimo and John Lloyd Cruz tandem after four years.

In January 2018, Geronimo released the single called "Sandata" and topped the iTunes Philippines chart for 4 consecutive days. The song also landed on Spotify Philippines Viral Chart. The official lyric video of the song was published on Viva Records' official channel a week later. On April, she released two singles called "Ganito" and "Duyan". Both songs topped the iTunes Philippines songs chart.

In March 2018, Geronimo was included at Spotify's "Amplify: Women of the World" global playlist with her song "Tayo" in celebration of Women's Month. She is the only OPM artist included alongside Rihanna, Dua Lipa, CL and more.

On April 14, 2018, she held her 15th anniversary concert called This Is Me stylized as "This 15 Me" at the Araneta Coliseum. The sold-out concert was reported as the "Highest Grossing Local Concert of All-time." The concert's official hashtag was also the number one trending topic on Twitter Philippines on the day of the concert with over 200,000 tweets, whilst recorded performances from the said concert instantly trended on YouTube Philippines, including her opening number "Dulo", her song and dance number for "Tala", the rendition of Whitney Houston's "I Have Nothing" and the rendition of Aerosmith's "I Don't Wanna Miss A Thing". Geronimo's take on the Dame Tu Cosita Dance Challenge also went viral on various social media platforms including Facebook.

In August 2018, Geronimo starred in her first title-role movie Miss Granny, a remake of the 2014 South Korean film of the same name. The film was both critically acclaimed and commercial success. Her performance was praised by both critics and viewers. Writing for Cosmopolitan Philippines, Ro Manalo stated "In my opinion, this was her (Sarah Geronimo) best performance as an actress to date. No other local female celebrity has the combination of characteristics required for the role—impeccable comedic timing, a talent for drama, a powerful singing voice, and an old soul with an almost manang charm. Sarah was so believable as a 70-year-old woman inside a 20-year-old's body." She is currently nominated as "Best Actress" at the 2018 Rawr Awards and Inside Showbiz Awards.

She released the first single from Miss Granny'''s movie soundtrack entitled "Kiss Me, Kiss Me" prior to the release of the film. The song went number one on iTunes Philippines and became an instant hit in the country. On July 15, Miss Granny soundtrack was released and also went number one. Its tracks "Isa Pang Araw", "Kiss Me, Kiss Me", and "Rain" all stayed on iTunes Philippines songs chart during and even after the run of the film in Philippine Cinemas.

She represented the Philippines at the 2nd ASEAN-Japan Music Festival held at the NHK Hall in Tokyo on October 4 where she performed her original hits "Kilometro" and "Tala". The event was hosted by Hikaru Nishida and Pico Taro coincided with the 45th anniversary of the ASEAN-Japan Friendship and Cooperation.

She went to Dubai for her This 15 Me concert and filled the 5,000-seater Dubai Duty-Free Stadium on September 20. Days after performing at ASEAN Music Festival, Geronimo staged her Nagoya, Japan leg of This 15 Me on October 7. She is set to stage her concert in Spain, Oman, and various cities in the Philippines.

While filming Miss Granny and touring the Philippines and the other side of the world for This 15 Me, Geronimo has been winning on various award-giving bodies in Manila. She won three awards at the 2018 MYX Music Awards including the "Female Artist of the Year" award and was hailed by EdukCircle Awards as the "Most Influential Actress" for her 2017 film Finally Found Someone.

In November 2018, Geronimo was hailed as the Best Pilipino Artist and the Most Popular BAMA 2018 Artist at the 2018 Big Apple Music Awards (BAMA), Geronimo failed to attend the ceremony held in New York but according to BAMA, the trophies were already sent to Geronimo. She staged her This 15 Me Laguna concert in Santa Rosa Sports Complex, Laguna the next day. It was the first-ever sold-out local show in the history of the said arena.
On December 23, 2018, she was announced a winner at Universal Music Awards 2018 in Warsaw, Poland with her song "Ganito". She beat more than 200 entries from different countries including songs by Ed Sheeran, Little Mix, Charlie Puth, Taylor Swift and more. She also bagged the Popular Award, while Charles Aznavour won the Historic Award.

On December 26, 2018, Geronimo's song "Sandata" topped CNN Philippines' "The 15 Best Filipino Songs of 2018" list.

2019–present: Unforgettable, Tala Dance Craze, Concerts, Awards and Recognitions
On January 29, 2019, Geronimo performed in front of 130,000 people who attended the first-ever holy mass of a Pope in the Middle East held at Zayed Sports City Stadium.

She performed in front of fans at Zurich and Milan on May 3 and 5 for her Europe concert tour after her "This 15 Me" anniversary concert in 2018.

Geronimo also supports incumbent senator Sonny Angara's re-election because 'of his advocacies'. Sarah also sang her song "Sa Iyo" as Angara's campaign jingle in 2013 and was reused in the upcoming elections.

On May 30, 2019, Shopee, the leading e-commerce platform in Southeast Asia and Taiwan, announced her as the brand's newest ambassador. A TV commercial was aired on the first of June.

Geronimo launched her own makeup line, Pop Studio, on May 31, 2019. It was a collaboration with iFace Inc.

On June 2, Geronimo tied with Kathryn Bernardo as Best Actress at the PMPC Star Awards for Movies 2019 against veteran actresses Judy Ann Santos, Gina Pareño, Gloria Romero, and more.

She was announced "Star of the Week" by a Germany-based entertainment website and music awards Daf Entertainment on July 31, 2019.

Her newest film, Unforgettable, under VIVA Films was released on October 23, 2019. It was directed by Jun Robles Lana, and also stars celebrity dog Milo, Gina Pareno, Ara Mina, Meg Imperial, and more.

On October 10, 2019, she won 3 awards from the 2019 Awit Awards including "Female Artist of the year", "Best Song was written for a Movie/TV/Stageplay", and "Best Performance by a Female Recording Artist."

In late 2019, "Tala" turned into a viral dance craze.

On January 27, 2020, Geronimo's single "Tala" entered the 12th spot in the Billboard Digital Song sales chart. The song also charted in more than 20
countries around the globe including the US, UK, Australia, New Zealand, Singapore, and more after it regained its popularity. It also reached the Global Viral 50 in Spotify, as well as YouTube's weekly global chart of world's most viewed music videos.

Geronimo won "Best Actress" award from 4th Guild of Educators, Mentors, and Students (GEMS) Hiyas ng Sining Awards last February 13 for her Unforgettable movie.

On February 27, Geronimo's viral song "Tala" had reached 100 million views on YouTube, making Geronimo the first local solo female artist to achieve the milestone.

On May, Sarah G received another international award as "Distinguished Entertainment Personality of the Year" award at the Akwa-Ibom State Advancement Awards 2020 (ASAA).

In June 2020, The music video of her song, "Tala" became the "Most Viewed OPM Music Video on YouTube".

She was also included the 2020 "Philippine’s Most Admired" list by YouGov PH.

In December 2020, Geronimo was included in Forbes Asia's 100 Digital Stars. She was also awarded as one of the "Most Influential Celebrities of The Decade" in the 10th EdukCircle Awards. She also garnered various recognitions such as Google PH's "Most Searched Lyrics and Songs" for her song "Tala", her movie Unforgettable is on the list of Netflix PH's "Most Watched Movie for Drama", Yahoo PH's "2nd Most Searched Female Personality" and YouTube Music included Sarah G's "Your Universe" in 3 of their playlists: Top Southeast Asian Song Of 2020, Top Song Of 2020 Philippines, and Top OPM 2020.

In May 2021, Geronimo's digital concert film Tala: The Film Concert received two encore screenings, with tickets selling for PHP 1,000.

Artistry
Geronimo's music is generally pop and sings songs mostly about love. International producer Christian de Walden praised Geronimo's voice and said "The personality of her voice is phenomenally distinct. Many have great voices but they tend to imitate foreign divas like Celine Dion, Mariah Carey or Whitney Houston. She definitely is the biggest talent I have come across within the last ten years...".

Rito P. Asilo of Philippine Daily Inquirer stated in a review of her album: "it's hard to resist the rich and lush quality of her melodies when they fall smoothly and squarely on her confident middle registers" and has praised her transition saying, "her phrasing style to her interchanging shifts in vocal placement, from deep chest tones to heady soft trills, and back which isn't really a bad thing: In fact, it could represent growth because Sarah used to win her admirers solely with the lung-busting high notes."

Influences
Geronimo has cited Michael Jackson as her major influence and she grew up singing and dancing to his music. Geronimo said: "As a child, my dream was to be hugely popular like Michael Jackson. I wanted to have that kind of worldwide fame," added, "I want to be like him while performing, everyone gets so wild and emotional. Besides that, I see him as not only a performer, he's an inspiration to many people, and that's what I also want to become." Geronimo also cited American pop star, Beyoncé as one of her influences in singing and dancing live.

Legacy
"Sarah's very successful concert showcased the various facets of her personality. She's an old soul who can sing Celine Dion's "If I Could" and Mariah Carey's "Through the Rain" with such emotion. She's an 80s baby who can moonwalk to "Billie Jean" ala Michael Jackson. She's a budding belter who can hit the high notes of Whitney Houston's "The Greatest Love of All" with Regine Velasquez."

Geronimo's participation in the "What Love Is..." with Martin Nievera concert was described by Baby A. Gil of the Philippine Star with the comment, "Who needs a dancing Martin anyway when you have the long-limbed Sarah there, who is a daring, enthusiastic dancer? I like watching her dance and finding her moving even better now than the last time is a treat. Of course, she has also become an even better singer. To those who are wont to ask, has she gotten rid of her Celine Dion tendencies? Well, she still sings a good To Love You More, but she has obviously come to her own with fuller tones, nice, sexy low notes."

In her 24/SG concert People's Journal commented, "Sarah has reached a new level in her career as a concert artist. In fact, she has earned the right to be called the Concert Queen of the New Generation." Aside from her singing prowess, Geronimo's dancing skills has improved greatly.

Her performances earned her a win at the 2016 Classic Rock Awards in Tokyo as "Best Asian Performer".

Image

Camille Bersola of The Philippine Star described Geronimo as more than just a pop icon for being an inspiration, especially to today's youth. She stated: "In amateur singing competitions, there will be at least three contestants that will have their own rendition of 'To Love You More' or 'Forever's Not Enough'. When these little girls are asked who their favorite singer is, and whose path they’d like to follow someday, you can bet more or less 75 percent of them will have the same answer: Sarah Geronimo."

Quezon City Vice Mayor Joy Belmonte described Geronimo in The Philippine Star: "She's wholesome on and off camera, untainted by unsavory rumors. She's an ideal daughter and that makes her a good role model for the youth." Wilson Lee Flores of The Philippine Star said, "She is a breath of fresh air in terms of wholesome image, humility, real talent and source of good news for the Philippine entertainment industry". In 2005, Geronimo was awarded with "Pinoy Wannabe Awardee", a prestigious Nickelodeon Kids' Choice Awards given to a celebrity whom kids consider as their role model. In 2006, QTV 11's magazine show Ang Pinaka named her as "Ang Pinaka Idol na Singer ng mga Bata."

Geronimo however admitted it's not always easy protecting that image, especially since everyone looks up to her as a role model for young people. She said, "It's a bit hard although I'd like to become a role model. I rather take it as a big challenge because it is probably my purpose being here in this industry. This may also be the reason why I'm being trusted by companies to promote their products."

Media reception
In 2011, Geronimo was ranked as the third in the top celebrity endorsers by the AGB Nielsen Philippines survey.
In 2013, she ranks as the sixth highest female taxpayer and as fourth top endorser.
In 2014, the entertainment publication YES! Magazine ranked Geronimo as the "Most Beautiful Star", leading the list as the top 1 of the top 100 celebrities. She also ranks in 2014, as the fourth highest female celebrity taxpayer.

Since 2014, Geronimo has been the most streamed solo Filipino artist in Spotify Philippines. In 2015, FAMAS named Geronimo the "Iconic Movie Queen of Philippine Cinema".

In December 2020, Forbes named Geronimo as one of Forbes Asia's 100 Digital Stars, a list of the most influential names in the Asia-Pacific region. She was praised for her efforts in helping Filipinos during the coronavirus pandemic.

Personal life and philanthropy
Geronimo attended Dominican School Manila for her primary education. She enrolled at University of Santo Tomas Education High School but later completed her secondary education at Angelicum College. Geronimo studied Associate in Arts program in University of the Philippines Open University (UP Open University).

Geronimo regularly holds benefit concerts for various charities for children and cancer patients and has been involved with several outreach programs and with Gawad Kalinga.

Geronimo is a born-again Christian. She stated that Gary Valenciano was responsible for renewing her faith and shared with her a verse from Jeremiah 29. In November 2019, she announced her engagement to long-time boyfriend, actor Matteo Guidicelli. They were secretly married in a Christian wedding at the Victory Christian Fellowship in Taguig at past six in the evening, Thursday night officiated by Senior Pastor Paulo Punzalan on February 20, 2020.

Discography

 Popstar: A Dream Come True (2003)
 Sweet Sixteen (2004)
 Becoming (2006)
 Taking Flight (2007)
 Just Me (2008)
 Your Christmas Girl (2009)
 Music and Me (2009)
 One Heart (2011)
 Pure OPM Classics (2012)
 Expressions (2013)
 Perfectly Imperfect (2014)
 The Great Unknown (2015)
 THIS 15 ME'' (2018)

Concerts
 Popstar: A Dream Come True Concert (2004)
 To Love Her More (2004)
 The Other Side (2005)
 In Motion (2007)
 The Next One (2008)
 Record Breaker (2009)
 What Love Is (Sarah & Martin) (2011)
 24/SG (2012)
 Perfect 10 (2013–2014)
 From The Top (2015–2016)
 The Great Unknown: Unplugged (2016–2017)
 This 15 Me (2018-2019)
 Unified (Sarah & Regine) (2020)
 Tala: The Film Concert (2021)
 Christmas with the Gs! (2021)

Filmography

Film

Television

Awards and recognitions

Sarah Geronimo has received awards and recognition in the entertainment industry (music, film, and television) and from other organizations including different international award-giving bodies such as 12 Awit Awards, 8 Aliw Awards, 28 Myx Music Awards, and a FAMAS Golden Artist Award.

She has also won the Best Asian Artist at the Mnet Asian Music Awards in 2012, Best Southeast Asian Act at the MTV Europe Music Awards in 2014, Best Selling Filipino Artist at the 22nd World Music Awards and Best Asian Performer at Classic Rock Roll of Honour Awards in 2016. She was inducted into the Anak TV Hall of Fame in 2013. Geronimo is a Goodwill Ambassador for Music of the National Commission for Culture and the Arts and a recipient of their Ani ng Dangal or "Harvest of Honors" state recognition for multi-disciplinary arts.

References

External links

 
1988 births
Living people
21st-century Filipino actresses
Actresses from Manila
Singers from Manila
People from Santa Cruz, Manila
World Music Awards winners
Filipino dance musicians
Hip hop singers
Filipino women pop singers
English-language singers from the Philippines
Filipino female dancers
Filipino female models
Filipino film actresses
Filipino television actresses
Reality show winners
Participants in Philippine reality television series
Viva Artists Agency
Mezzo-sopranos
ABS-CBN personalities
TV5 (Philippine TV network) personalities
Viva Records (Philippines) artists
University of the Philippines Open University alumni
21st-century Filipino women singers
21st-century Filipino singers
Filipino television variety show hosts
Filipino people of Chinese descent
MTV Europe Music Award winners
Women hip hop musicians